The 2019 European Sambo Championships is an edition of the European Sambo Championships, organized by the European Sambo Federation. It was held in Gijón, Spain from 17 to 19 May 2019.

Medal summary

Men's events

Source Results

Women's events

Source Results

Combat Sambo Events

Source Results

Medal table

References

External links
 

European Sambo Championships
European Championships
Sambo
Sambo in Spain
Sambo
Sambo, European Championships